The following is a production discography of American singer and record producer Tyrone "Hurt-M-Badd" Wrice. It includes a list of songs produced, co-produced and remixed by year, title, artist and album.

Production credits

Remixes

References

External links

Hip hop discographies
Production discographies
Discographies of American artists
Albums produced by Hurt-M-Badd
Song recordings produced by Hurt-M-Badd